Apps to analyse COVID-19 sounds are mobile software applications designed to collect respiratory sounds and aid diagnosis in response to the COVID-19 pandemic. Numerous applications are in development, with different institutions and companies taking various approaches to privacy and data collection. Current efforts are aimed at gathering data. In a later stage, it is possible that sound apps will have the capacity (and ethical approvals) to provide information back to users. In order to develop and train signal analysis approaches, large datasets are required.

History
The COVID-19 outbreak was announced as a global pandemic by the World Health Organization in March 2020 and has affected a growing number of people globally. In this context, advanced artificial intelligence techniques are being considered as tools in aiding our response to global health crisis. Other COVID-19 apps which offer solutions for user tracking have been developed. At the same time a number of approaches which tries to use respiratory sounds and artificial intelligence to understand if the disease can be diagnosed have been proposed. A few studies are available as preprints (i.e. not yet peer reviewed) documents.

Methodologies
The potential for using speech and sound analysis by artificial intelligence to help in this scenario, by surveying which types of related or contextually significant phenomena can be automatically assessed from speech or sound has been recently overviewed. These include the automatic recognition and monitoring of breathing, dry and wet coughing or sneezing sounds, speech under cold, eating behaviour, sleepiness, or pain.

Additionally, the potential use-cases of intelligent speech analysis for COVID-19 diagnosed patients has also been presented. In particular, by analysing speech recordings from these patients, an audio-only-based model to automatically categorise the health state of patients from four aspects, including the severity of illness, sleep quality, fatigue, and anxiety, is constructed. This work shows promise in estimating the severity of illness.

Machine learning methods have been explored to recognize and diagnose coughs from different diseases. These included a low complexity, automated recognition and diagnostic tool for screening respiratory infections that utilizes convolutional neural networks (CNNs) to detect cough within environment audio and diagnose three potential illnesses (i.e. bronchitis, bronchiolitis and pertussis) based on their unique cough audio features.

A large-scale crowdsourced dataset of respiratory sounds has been collected to aid diagnosis of COVID-19: coughs and breathing sounds are sufficient to distinguish users affected by COVID-19 versus those affected by asthma or healthy controls.

Behind these studies is the ambition that automated systems to screen for respiratory diseases based on voice, raw cough or other sound data would have positive medical applications in both clinical and public health arenas.

List of apps to analyse COVID-19 sounds

References 

Mobile applications
Software associated with the COVID-19 pandemic